Valentin Wiery (12 February 1813 – 29 December 1880) was an Austrian Catholic Bishop.

Wiery was born in St Marein in Wolfsberg, was educated locally (learning the Slovenian language) and was ordained on 24 August 1835.

In 1858, Wiery was consecrated Bishop of Gurk by Maximilian Joseph von Tarnóczy, Archbishop of Salzburg. His consecration was considered a display of Tarnóczy's personal power and Wiery came to be considered a prominent modern Prince-Bishop.

Wiery died on 29 December 1880.

References

1813 births
1880 deaths
Bishops of Gurk
Roman Catholic bishops in the Austrian Empire